Aaron Axelsen is an American dj who works introducing alternative and other new music. For 23 years he was music director of Live 105 (later Alt 105) in San Francisco where he was the first to play on commercial radio, among others, Arcade Fire, Bastille, Coldplay, Lana Del Rey, Billie Eilish, Foster The People, Franz Ferdinand, Imagine Dragons, The Killers, Lorde, Muse, The 1975, Phoenix, The Strokes, and Twenty One Pilots. He is the owner and dj of Popscene, a San Francisco club that has given the San Francisco debut to acts such as The Killers, including the only San Francisco show of Amy Winehouse.

References

External links
Aaron Axelsen
Popscene

People from Livermore, California
American radio DJs
Latter Day Saints from California
Year of birth missing (living people)
Living people